The women's 400 metres event at the 2021 European Athletics U23 Championships was held in Tallinn, Estonia, at Kadriorg Stadium on 8, 9 and 10 July.

Records
Prior to the competition, the records were as follows:

Results

Round 1
Qualification rule: First 3 in each heat (Q) and the next 4 fastest (q) advance to the Semi-Finals.

Semifinals
Qualification rule:  First 3 in each heat (Q) and the next 2 fastest (q) advance to the Final.

Final

References

400 metres
400 metres at the European Athletics U23 Championships